Nerijus Vasiliauskas (born 20 June 1977) is a former Lithuanian professional football player.

External links
 

1977 births
Living people
Lithuanian footballers
Lithuania international footballers
Lithuanian expatriate footballers
Lithuanian expatriate sportspeople in Poland
Expatriate footballers in Ukraine
Lithuanian expatriate sportspeople in Ukraine
Wisła Płock players
JK Sillamäe Kalev players
FC Lokomotiv Nizhny Novgorod players
Russian Premier League players
Expatriate footballers in Russia
FK Žalgiris players
SC Tavriya Simferopol players
Ukrainian Premier League players
Ekstraklasa players
Expatriate footballers in Estonia
Expatriate footballers in Poland
Association football midfielders